In abstract algebra, a congruence relation (or simply congruence) is an equivalence relation on an algebraic structure (such as a group, ring, or vector space) that is compatible with the structure in the sense that algebraic operations done with equivalent elements will yield equivalent elements.  Every congruence relation has a corresponding quotient structure, whose elements are the equivalence classes (or congruence classes) for the relation.

Basic example

The prototypical example of a congruence relation is congruence modulo  on the set of integers.
 

 

Congruence modulo  (for a fixed ) is compatible with both addition and multiplication on the integers.  That is,

if

  and 

then

   and  

The corresponding addition and multiplication of equivalence classes is known as modular arithmetic.  From the point of view of abstract algebra, congruence modulo  is a congruence relation on the ring of integers, and arithmetic modulo  occurs on the corresponding quotient ring.

Definition
The definition of a congruence depends on the type of algebraic structure under consideration.  Particular definitions of congruence can be made for groups, rings, vector spaces, modules, semigroups, lattices, and so forth.  The common theme is that a congruence is an equivalence relation on an algebraic object that is compatible with the algebraic structure, in the sense that the operations are well-defined on the equivalence classes.

Example: Groups
For example, a group is an algebraic object consisting of a set together with a single binary operation, satisfying certain axioms.
 and  
for all . For a congruence on a group, the equivalence class containing the identity element is always a normal subgroup, and the other equivalence classes are the other cosets of this subgroup.  Together, these equivalence classes are the elements of a quotient group.

Example: Rings
When an algebraic structure includes more than one operation, congruence relations are required to be compatible with each operation.  For example, a ring possesses both addition and multiplication, and a congruence relation on a ring must satisfy
 and 
For a congruence on a ring, the equivalence class containing 0 is always a two-sided ideal, and the two operations on the set of equivalence classes define the corresponding quotient ring.

General
The general notion of a congruence relation can be formally defined in the context of universal algebra, a field which studies ideas common to all algebraic structures.  In this setting, a relation  on a given algebraic structure is called compatible if

A congruence relation on the structure is then defined as an equivalence relation that is also compatible.

Relation with homomorphisms
If  is a homomorphism between two algebraic structures (such as homomorphism of groups, or a linear map between vector spaces), then the relation  defined by

 if and only if  

By the first isomorphism theorem, the image of A under  is a substructure of B isomorphic to the quotient of A by this congruence.

On the other hand, the congruence relation  induces a unique homomorphism  given by

.

Thus, there is a natural correspondence between the congruences and the homomorphisms of any given algebraic structure.

Congruences of groups, and normal subgroups and ideals
In the particular case of groups, congruence relations can be described in elementary terms as follows:
If G is a group (with identity element e and operation *) and ~ is a binary relation on G, then ~ is a congruence whenever:
Given any element a of G, a ~ a (reflexivity);
Given any elements a and b of G, if a ~ b, then b ~ a (symmetry);
Given any elements a, b, and c of G, if a ~ b and b ~ c, then a ~ c (transitivity);
Given any elements a, a' , b, and b'  of G, if a ~ a'  and b ~ b' , then a * b ~ a'  * b' ;
Given any elements a and a'  of G, if a ~ a' , then a−1 ~ a' −1 (this can actually be proven from the other four, so is strictly redundant).

Conditions 1, 2, and 3 say that ~ is an equivalence relation.

A congruence ~ is determined entirely by the set {a ∈ G : a ~ e} of those elements of G that are congruent to the identity element, and this set is a normal subgroup.
Specifically,  if and only if b−1 * a ~ e.
So instead of talking about congruences on groups, people usually speak in terms of normal subgroups of them; in fact, every congruence corresponds uniquely to some normal subgroup of G.

Ideals of rings and the general case 

A similar trick allows one to speak of kernels in ring theory as ideals instead of congruence relations, and in module theory as submodules instead of congruence relations.

A more general situation where this trick is possible is with Omega-groups (in the general sense allowing operators with multiple arity). But this cannot be done with, for example, monoids, so the study of congruence relations plays a more central role in monoid theory.

Universal algebra

The general notion of a congruence is particularly useful in universal algebra. An equivalent formulation in this context is the following:

A congruence relation on an algebra A is a subset of the direct product A × A that is both an equivalence relation on A and a subalgebra of A × A.

The kernel of a homomorphism is always a congruence. Indeed, every congruence arises as a kernel.
For a given congruence ~ on A, the set A/~ of equivalence classes can be given the structure of an algebra in a natural fashion, the quotient algebra.
The function that maps every element of A to its equivalence class is a homomorphism, and the kernel of this homomorphism is ~.

The lattice Con(A) of all congruence relations on an algebra A is algebraic.

John M. Howie described how semigroup theory illustrates congruence relations in universal algebra:
In a group a congruence is determined if we know a single congruence class, in particular if we know the normal subgroup which is the class containing the identity. Similarly, in a ring a congruence is determined if we know the ideal which is the congruence class containing the zero. In semigroups there is no such fortunate occurrence, and we are therefore faced with the necessity of studying congruences as such. More than anything else, it is this necessity that gives semigroup theory its characteristic flavour. Semigroups are in fact the first and simplest type of algebra to which the methods of universal algebra must be applied…

See also
Chinese remainder theorem
Congruence lattice problem
Table of congruences

Explanatory notes

Notes

References
 Horn and Johnson, Matrix Analysis, Cambridge University Press, 1985. . (Section 4.5 discusses congruency of matrices.)
 

Modular arithmetic
Algebra
Binary relations
Equivalence (mathematics)
Universal algebra